Saša Radulović (born 4 April 1984) is a Serbian football forward who plays for Kopaonik Brus in Serbian League East.

References

External links
 
 

1984 births
Living people
Association football forwards
Serbian footballers
FK BSK Borča players
FK Radnički Niš players
FK Napredak Kruševac players
Serbian SuperLiga players
Serbian expatriate footballers
Expatriate footballers in Austria
SV Spittal players